The Newark Railway was incorporated on December 10, 1890, and was a short, 1-mile connection between the Lehigh Valley Railroad's Newark and Roselle Railway and the Pennsylvania Railroad (PRR).  Upon completion on Feb 16, 1891, all passenger traffic, which had previously been routed to the PRR at Metuchen, instead took the route from South Plainfield to Newark, where it connected with the PRR and continued to the PRR station in Jersey City.  The Newark Railway also served a LVRR freight and coal depot at Pennsylvania Avenue, adjacent to the PRR junction.

In 1891 the LVRR consolidated the railroads along the Jersey City route into the Lehigh Valley Terminal Railway.  Besides the Newark Railway, the other consolidated companies were the Roselle and South Plainfield Railway, the Newark and Roselle Railway the Newark and Passaic Railway, the Jersey City, Newark and Western Railway, the Jersey City Terminal Railway, and the Edgewater Railway.

References 
 Annual Report of the State Board of Assessors of the State of New Jersey for the Year 1890, p. 60. Google books
 News about Railroads, New York Times, Aug 27, 1891
 One Hundred Years of The Lehigh Valley, Lehigh Valley Railroad Centennial, 1846-1946
 Annual Report of the Lehigh Valley Railroad Company for the Fiscal Year Ending November 30, 1891

Predecessors of the Lehigh Valley Railroad
Defunct New Jersey railroads
Railway companies established in 1890
Railway companies disestablished in 1891